Tasmantrix fragilis is a moth of the family Micropterigidae from eastern Australia. It is known only from a single locality in the Shoalhaven catchment in New South Wales.

The forewing length is 2.7 mm for males. The forewing has strong purplish-bronze reflections. There are two shining white fasciae, the first is a prominent subcostal streak in the middle of the wing, spanning nearly one third of the wing length, it is contiguous with the white dorsum of the head above the eyes when at rest and with softly rounded distal end. The second is a strong transverse, slightly sinuous band at mid-length, inclined towards the apex as it approaches the termen and varying in width from almost parallel-sided to hourglass-shaped or even in two discrete parts when the centre portion is missing. There are some indistinct white patches on the apical quarter of the wing, each comprising only a few scales. The fringes are black and white-tipped. The hindwing is dark brownish-black with purple reflections. The fringes are dark brownish-black.

Etymology
The species name is derived from Latin fragilis (fragile) and refers to the delicate form of this species, which is the smallest species of the genus Tasmantrix.

References

Micropterigidae
Moths described in 2010